The 1959–60 Scottish Cup was the 75th staging of Scotland's most prestigious football knockout competition. The Cup was won by Rangers who defeated Kilmarnock in the final.

First round

Replays

Second round

Replays

Second Replays

Third round

Quarter-finals

Semi-finals

Replays

Final

Teams

See also

1959–60 in Scottish football
1959–60 Scottish League Cup

External links
 Video highlights from official Pathé News archive

Scottish Cup seasons
1959–60 in Scottish football
Scot